The 1939–40 Boston Bruins season was the Boston Bruins' 16th season of operation in the National Hockey League. The Bruins finished first over-all, but could not repeat as Stanley Cup champions, losing in the playoff semi-final to the New York Rangers.

Offseason

Regular season

Final standings

Record vs. opponents

Schedule and results

Playoffs
The Boston Bruins lost the Semi-Finals to the New York Rangers 4–2

Boston Bruins 2, New York Rangers 4

Player statistics

Regular season
Scoring

Goaltending

Playoffs
Scoring

Goaltending

Awards and records

Transactions

See also
1939–40 NHL season

References

Boston Bruins seasons
Boston Bruins
Boston Bruins
Boston Bruins
Boston Bruins
1930s in Boston
1940s in Boston